Rathaspick is a civil parish in County Westmeath, Ireland.

Rathaspick is one of 6 civil parishes in the barony of Moygoish in the Province of Leinster.

Rathaspick civil parish comprises the village of Rathowen and 26 townlands: Ballydorey, Ballygarran, Ballygarvey, Ballygarveybeg, Bardanstown, Caraun  Kilmacahill, Carrigagh, Clonaboy, Corry, Cross, Crumlin a.k.a. Rockfield, Curristeen, Derrydooan Lower, Derrydooan Middle, Derrydooan Upper, Henfield, Joanstown, Killinagh, Kilmacahill a.k.a. Caraun, Mace, Newpass Demesne, Rathaspick, Rathclittagh, Rathowen, Rathowen (Edward), Rockfield a.k.a. Crumlin, Stongaluggaun and Windtown.

The neighbouring civil parishes are: Russagh to the north, Lackan (barony of Corkaree) to the east, Kilbixy and Kilmacnevan to the south and Ardagh, Mostrim and Rathreagh (all in the barony of Ardagh, County Longford) to the west.

References

External links
Rathaspick civil parish at the IreAtlas Townland Data Base
Rathaspick civil parish at Townlands.ie
Rathaspick civil parish at Logainm.ie

Civil parishes of County Westmeath